Aloysius Liguda (January 23, 1898 – December 8, 1942), was a priest and is venerated as a blessed martyr of the Society Of The Divine Word Missionaries (SVD). Liguda was a chaplain, and teacher. He died at Dachau concentration camp in the course of medical experimentation.

Life
Alojzy Liguda was born in Winów near Opole, Poland in 1892, the youngest of seven children of Wojciech and Rozalia Przybyl Liguda. His father used to lead pilgrimages to the Basilica of the Visitation in  Wambierzyce and to Mount St. Anne. Liguda was a good student; he became interested in the missions in China and Africa from reading magazines.

At the age of fifteen, Liguda entered the Divine Word minor seminary at Nysa. He was drafted in 1917 and sent to the French front as an artilleryman. After the war, he returned to the seminary to complete his studies. In 1920 he went to the Society of the Divine Word novitiate in Mödling, Austria. He was then sent for teacher training to Pieniezno, where he taught Latin and mathematics at the minor seminary. From there he returned to St. Gabriel's in Mödling for further studies in dogmatics and church history. At age 35, in 1927, he was ordained as a priest. 

Liguda was assigned to the provincial house in Górna Grupa. After validating his secondary education certificate he was accepted to the Polish Philology Faculty at the University of Poznań. In Poznań he also served a chaplain and religious education teacher at the Ursuline Sisters school for girls. He returned to Grupa and taught at the minor seminary; he also served as chaplain to the garrison in Grupa on Sundays. In the summer of 1939 he became the rector of the monastery at Gorna Grupa. 

In February 1940, turned the SVD house into a makeshift detention camp for the religious and seminarians. He was sent from one camp to another: Nowy Port in Gdańsk, Sachsenhausen, and Stutthof. By December he was in Dachau, and since he knew German, he was a translator for most of the internees. After the war, it turned out that he could successfully apply for release from the camp. The family had German citizenship, he himself was a war veteran, and two brothers died at the front. Liguda did not apply because he felt responsible for his Polish pupils. Always he tried to keep up morale with his calm demeanor and a ready joke. 

Liguda had contracted tuberculosis but by December 1942 his health had much improved. Nonetheless, he was placed on the "disabled" list by a kapo in revenge for Liguda's criticism of the kapo's unfair distribution of food. Liguda and fellow inmates were transported by German soldiers into a nearby water reservoir where they all drowned. The Germans were conducting medical experiments to determine the effect of ice cold water on the human body, relative to the rescue of downed pilots. The family was advised, however, that the cause of death was tuberculosis.

His body was burnt in the Dachau crematorium; the coffin with ashes was handed over to relatives and buried in the family tomb. In 2016, some of the ashes, as well as those of other martyrs of the Dachau concentration camp were place in the Church of the Holy Spirit in his hometown of Winów.

"In the Dachau prison camp near Munich in Germany, Blessed Louis Liguda, priest of the Society of the Divine Word and martyr, who, during the wartime invasion of Poland, was slain by the prison guards witness to Christ the Lord until death."(Roman Martyrology)

Works
 Audi filia, - regarding Pope Pius XI’s encyclical "About the Christian Education"
 Go forward and higher - conferences and sermons
 Bread and Salt - Sunday homilies

References

1898 births
1942 deaths
108 Blessed Polish Martyrs
20th-century Polish Roman Catholic priests
Polish people who died in Dachau concentration camp
20th-century venerated Christians
Polish civilians killed in World War II
People from Opole County